Micleşti may refer to:

Micleşti, a commune in Criuleni district, Moldova
Micleşti, a commune in Vaslui County, Romania
Micleşti, a village in Banca Commune, Vaslui County, Romania

See also 
 Miclea (surname)